The Schwarzhorn is a mountain of the Bernese Alps, located west of Leukerbad in the canton of Valais. It lies approximately halfway between the Wildstrubel and the Gemmi Pass.

Politically, the Schwarzhorn belongs to the municipalities of Leukerbad, Inden and Mollens.

References

External links
 Schwarzhorn on Hikr

Bernese Alps
Mountains of the Alps
Alpine three-thousanders
Mountains of Valais
Mountains of Switzerland